Grizzard is an unincorporated community in Sussex County, Virginia, United States.

Fortsville was listed on the National Register of Historic Places in 1970.

References

Unincorporated communities in Sussex County, Virginia